Stan & Ollie is a 2018 biographical comedy-drama film directed by Jon S. Baird. The script, written by Jeff Pope, was inspired by Laurel and Hardy: The British Tours by A.J. Marriot which chronicled the later years of the comedy double act Laurel and Hardy; the film stars Steve Coogan and John C. Reilly as Stan Laurel and Oliver Hardy. The film focuses on details of the comedy duo's personal relationship while relating how they embarked on a gruelling music hall tour of the United Kingdom and Ireland during 1953 and struggled to get another film made.

The film premiered on 21 October 2018 at the closing night gala of the BFI London Film Festival. It was released in the United States on 28 December 2018 and in the United Kingdom on 11 January 2019. At the 76th Golden Globe Awards, Reilly was nominated for Best Actor – Motion Picture Musical or Comedy, and at the 72nd British Academy Film Awards the film earned three nominations, including Best British Film and Best Actor in a Leading Role for Coogan.

Plot 
In 1937, while making Way Out West, Stan Laurel and Oliver Hardy discuss their contracts, agreeing they are not being justly compensated. Stan advocates leaving Hal Roach to set up their own production company while Oliver is reluctant to rock the boat. Later, at Fox Studios, Stan waits for Oliver so they can sign to Fox. Oliver doesn't show and remains tied to Roach, who puts him in the film Zenobia with an elephant, leading to a rift between the two men.

In 1953, they embark on a music hall tour of the UK and Ireland while trying to get a comedic movie of Robin Hood made. Poor publicity in Britain has the tour begin in near-empty backstreet theatres as producer Bernard Delfont focuses on his up-and-coming star Norman Wisdom. Public appearances improve ticket sales, and they sell out much larger prestigious venues.

Meanwhile, driven by Stan, they continue to write and develop for the movie against an ominous silence from its London producer. Stan discovers the movie has been cancelled for insufficient funding. Unable to tell Oliver, he continues work on the script.

Their wives, Ida Laurel and Lucille Hardy, join them at the Savoy Hotel. They sell out the Lyceum Theatre where, at the opening night party, Ida mentions the "elephant movie" resulting in an argument over the contract fiasco 16 years earlier. Stan expresses resentment at Oliver's betrayal of their friendship and accuses him of laziness; Oliver says they were never true friends, that Stan is a hollow man hiding behind his typewriter. When Stan says, "I loved us", Oliver counters that Stan loved Laurel and Hardy, "but you never loved me."

Judging a beauty contest in Worthing, Oliver pointedly rebuffs Stan's attempts at conversation and collapses as Stan addresses the crowd. Delfont suggests Stan replace him with English comic Nobby Cook. Stan goes to Oliver who tells him he is retiring. Going on stage could be fatal, so Oliver has promised Lucille he will not and they will leave for America as soon as possible. They agree it is for the best, that Stan will carry on with a new partner, and that they had not meant the things they said in their argument.

At the next show, Stan observes Nobby Cook onstage from the wings as the orchestra tunes up. Delfont and Ida watch from a box as the Laurel and Hardy Overture is played only to be interrupted by an announcement that the performance has been cancelled. Ida finds Stan at the bar, he says he loves Oliver and will not continue the tour without him, and not to upset Oliver by telling him. Oliver, in his room, recalls the doctor's words while reminiscing appreciative fans. Lucille returns from an errand to find him gone; he is at Stan's door telling him not to leave as they have shows to perform.

On the boat to Ireland Stan confesses there is no longer a movie and Oliver says he knew, and thought Stan knew he knew. Stan asks why, then, did they continue to rehearse, and Oliver asks "What else are we going to do?" A large crowd welcomes their arrival in Ireland as church bells ring out their tune. Onstage Stan expresses concern for Oliver's condition in moments when they are hidden from the audience and says they need not finish with the song. Oliver says he is fine, and surprises Stan by announcing to the audience that they will finish with a dance - to Lucille's consternation. As they perform "At the Ball, That's All" Ida takes, and squeezes, Lucille's hand. Stan and Ollie take their bow to wild cheering and applause.

A text epilogue explains they never performed together again; Oliver's health did not recover and he died in 1957. Stan refused all offers to perform without Oliver but continued, until his death in 1965, to write material for Laurel and Hardy.

Real-life background

The film's story differs from events as they actually happened; while the film is based on fact, the sequence of events has been juggled and simplified. The "Mrs. Laurel" character is inaccurate: Laurel had married the quietly devoted Ida Kitaeva Raphael in 1946, but the film character is based for comic effect on one of his former wives, the strident Countess Illeana. The scene of Laurel waiting for Hardy at the 20th Century-Fox studios, with Hardy preferring to remain with Hal Roach, is fictitious: while Laurel's contract with Roach had expired, Hardy's had not. Moreover, the team did not report to Fox until July 11, 1941, well after both had severed their connections with Roach. The scene of Laurel and Hardy arguing bitterly was staged for dramatic effect; in reality the comedians never argued. Lucille Hardy, his widow, remembered Hardy being angry with Laurel only once, out of Laurel's hearing: the comedians had agreed to present a strong, united front when negotiating with Hal Roach, only to have Laurel meekly agreeing to Roach's demands.

Starting in October 1953, Laurel and Hardy spent eight months on tour. On arriving at Cobh in Ireland on 9 September 1953 and disembarking from the SS America they were given a warm welcome, and this is recreated in the final scene of the film. Following their opening night at the Palace Theatre, Plymouth on 17 May 1954, Hardy had a mild heart attack. Hardy stayed at the Grand Hotel in Plymouth while recovering. The pair sailed back to the United States on 2 June. The remainder of the tour was cancelled, and Laurel and Hardy never performed together on stage again. The character of Nobby Cook portrayed in the film is fictional. There was never a plan to continue the tour without Hardy, as Laurel would have refused to work with anyone else.

Cast 

 Steve Coogan as Stanley "Stan" Laurel
 John C. Reilly as Oliver "Ollie" Hardy
 Shirley Henderson as Lucille Hardy
 Nina Arianda as Ida Kitaeva Laurel
 Rufus Jones as Bernard Delfont
 Danny Huston as Hal Roach
 Joseph Balderrama as James W. Horne
 John Henshaw as Nobby Cook
 Keith MacPherson as James Finlayson
 Richard Cant as Harry Langdon
 Susy Kane as Cynthia Clarke, Harold Miffin's Head of Production

Production

Development 
Steve Coogan and John C. Reilly were announced in January 2016 as lined up to play the duo in a biopic to be directed by Jon S. Baird. The film was written by Jeff Pope, who had previously collaborated with Coogan on the Oscar-nominated screenplay for Philomena. Pope described the comedy duo as being his "heroes". Pope took inspiration from Laurel and Hardy: The British Tours by A.J. Marriot, which also served as a research tool. Pope also spoke with great-granddaughter Cassidy Cook, who gave Pope access to the Laurel family archive.

Filming 
Principal UK photography began in spring 2017. It took place at the Black Country Living Museum in Dudley, in the West Midlands of England, the Old Rep theatre Birmingham, the West London Film Studios, and Bristol in south-west England. Part of the filming also took place in Worthing, West Sussex.

Filming hours were limited due to Reilly needing four hours in the makeup chair each day.

Release 
The film premiered at the closing night gala of the BFI London Film Festival on 21 October 2018 at the Cineworld, Leicester Square. While Entertainment One Films handled distribution in the United Kingdom, Canada, Australia, New Zealand, Spain and Benelux, Sony Pictures Classics were given the right to distribute the film in the United States, Latin America, Eastern Europe, China, and South Africa.

Reception

Critical response 
Following Stan & Ollie'''s October 2018 debut at the BFI London Film Festival, the film received positive reviews from critics. The website's critical consensus reads, "Stan & Ollie pays tribute to a pair of beloved entertainers with an affectionate look behind the scenes -- and a moving look at the burdens and blessings of a creative bond." On Metacritic, the film has a weighted average score of 75 out of 100, based on 41 critics, indicating "generally favorable reviews".

Guy Lodge of Variety wrote: "Portraying Laurel and Hardy's final comic collaboration with bittersweet affection, Jon S. Baird's film is a laid-back, gamely performed tribute".
Todd McCarthy of The Hollywood Reporter'' had high praise for the lead actors, saying: "Much of the time, you feel like you're beholding the real duo, so thoroughly conceived are the actors' physicality and performances". He concluded: "Everything the film has to offer is obvious and on the surface, its pleasures simple and sincere under the attentive guidance of director Jon S. Baird".

Accolades

References

External links 
 
 
 

2018 films
2010s biographical films
2010s historical comedy-drama films
Laurel and Hardy
American biographical films
American historical comedy-drama films
British biographical films
British historical comedy-drama films
Canadian biographical films
Canadian comedy-drama films
Biographical films about actors
Cultural depictions of Laurel & Hardy
Drama films based on actual events
Films set in 1937
Films set in 1953
Films set in the 1950s
Sony Pictures Classics films
Films scored by Rolfe Kent
Films directed by Jon S. Baird
2010s English-language films
2010s Canadian films
2010s American films
2010s British films